Brian Begley may refer to:
 Brian Begley (dual player) (born 1979), Irish hurler and Gaelic footballer
 Brian Begley (rugby union) (born 1973), Irish rugby union player